tert-Butylbenzene is an organic compound classified as an aromatic hydrocarbon. Its structure consists of a benzene ring substituted with a tert-butyl group. It is a flammable colorless liquid which is nearly insoluble in water but miscible with organic solvents.

Production 
tert-Butylbenzene can be produced by the treatment of benzene with isobutene or by the reaction of benzene with tert-butyl chloride in presence of anhydrous aluminium chloride, the latter is depicted below:

References 

Alkylbenzenes
C4-Benzenes